Lawrence Ng Kai-wah (born 19 May 1964) is a popular TV actor in Hong Kong. His more famous works include the television series Healing Hands and the films Fate Twisters and Sex and Zen.

Ng's older brother is former Charlie Ng Kai-ming, who also worked for TVB, but left the acting world in 1994 to become a stockbroker and now owner of a restaurant chain with locations in Hong Kong and China.

Career
Lawrence's first appearance was in 1986 in the TV series The Feud of Two Brothers (流氓大亨); he was cast as villain Chung Wai-shun. Wai-shun had conflicts with his brother, even though the latter cared about him. As the villain, Lawrence killed his own father but was found not guilty, caused a girl who had a crush on him to become disabled,  and left a woman (Dodo Cheng) paralyzed. Since his early beginnings in the television industry, he has been an actor of Hong Kong's TVB as a lead male for the great extent of his career.

In 1991 Lawrence starred in the infamous erotic film Sex and Zen (玉蒲團之偷情寶鑑) alongside Amy Yip. Although the it was a massive success at the box office and many people, outside of Hong Kong and unfamiliar with his long television career, best identify him for his role in the film, Lawrence mentioned in an interview that he was embarrassed for having made it (had it not been for certain "trying" reasons) and wishes that he instead be known for his serious character roles in modern and period drama TV series.

Although he continues to be a popular leading actor in Hong Kong, playing only the lead male role, Lawrence Ng has decided to pursue his talent in business, leaving the full-time entertainment industry, stating that "an actor cannot act forever". He married his girlfriend, Shek Yeung Chi, a model from mainland China after terminating his per-series contract with TVB in May 2007. His business ventures (European restaurants) have also recently begun operating and some also have closed down.

Filmography

References

External links
 
 Entry at lovehkfilm.com

1964 births
Living people
Hong Kong male actors
TVB actors